Russell Jackson may refer to:

Russ Jackson (born 1936), Canadian footballer
Russell Jackson (1890–1956), of the Jackson baronets
Russell B Jackson, American upright and electric bass player
Russell Jackson, in the television show Madam Secretary, the fictitious Presidential Chief of Staff, as played by Željko Ivanek